The progression of the British football transfer fee record tracks the increases in the record for the highest transfer fee paid or received by British association football clubs. A transfer fee is the sum of money paid by one club to purchase the contract, and therefore the playing services, of a professional footballer. Fees are not generally formally disclosed by the clubs involved, and discrepancies can occur in figures quoted in the press. Trevor Francis, for example, is regarded as Britain's first £1m player but was officially transferred for £975,000. The generally reported figure of £1,180,000 included Value Added Tax, fees to the Football League and Francis' signing fee. Discrepancies may also occur due to deals which involve additional sums to be paid at a later date after a player has made a certain number of appearances, joint fees for two or more players, or deals in which one player is exchanged for a sum of money plus another player.

The first-ever three-figure transfer fee was the £100 paid by Aston Villa in 1893 for Willie Groves. Eleven years later, Alf Common joined Middlesbrough for the first ever four-figure fee, a sum which caused a national sensation and outrage amongst the football authorities. The £5,000 mark was first reached in 1922 when Falkirk paid that amount for West Ham United's Syd Puddefoot, and six years later Arsenal paid the first ever £10,000 fee to acquire David Jack of Bolton Wanderers. After the Second World War, the spending power of clubs in mainland Europe outstripped that of British clubs for the first time, resulting in several substantial jumps in the transfer record. John Charles became the first British player to command a fee of £50,000 when he joined Juventus in 1957, and four years later Denis Law joined Torino in the first £100,000 transaction involving a British club.

The 1970s saw a rapid increase in transfer fees. Martin Peters became the first £200,000 player in 1970, but by 1977 Kevin Keegan's move to West Germany's Hamburger SV had taken the record to £500,000. In January 1979 David Mills became the first player to be purchased for £500,000 by a British club, but just one month later Nottingham Forest paid twice that amount to acquire Birmingham City's Trevor Francis. In 1981 Bryan Robson cost Manchester United £1,500,000, but fees paid by British clubs lagged behind those paid by clubs in Italy, France and Spain to take British players abroad until 1995, when Manchester United paid Newcastle United £7,000,000 for Andy Cole. The fees paid by the Premier League's top clubs began to increase at a rapid rate, with Alan Shearer commanding the first £15,000,000 fee in 1996, and the new millennium heralding the first £30,000,000 transfer, although sources differ as to whether this barrier was broken by Rio Ferdinand's move to Manchester United in 2002 or Andriy Shevchenko's transfer to Chelsea four years later.

On 1 September 2008, Manchester City agreed a reported £32,500,000 fee for Robinho, which remained the record amount paid by a British club until 31 January 2011, when Liverpool paid £35,000,000 for Andy Carroll from Newcastle United, which was also a new record amount paid for a British player. A few hours later, the record amount paid by a British club was broken again when Chelsea paid £50,000,000 for Fernando Torres from Liverpool.

On 11 June 2009, Manchester United announced that they had accepted an £80,000,000 bid from Real Madrid for Cristiano Ronaldo. The transfer was completed on 1 July 2009, setting not only a new British transfer record, but also a new world record (either in pounds or euros). In turn, that record was broken on 1 September 2013 when Real announced that their £85.3 million (€100 million) purchase of Gareth Bale from Tottenham Hotspur had been completed.

This record was broken on 8 August 2016, when Manchester United signed Paul Pogba from Juventus for a fee of £89 million, again on 6 January 2018, when Philippe Coutinho moved to Barcelona from Liverpool for a reported initial fee of £106 million, which could rise to £142 million with various clauses being met, and lastly on 31 January 2023, when Chelsea signed Argentine player Enzo Fernández for a reported deal of £106 million, becoming the most expensive transfer in British football.

Record progression

Notes

See also 
List of most expensive association football transfers
Transfer (football)

References

Bibliography

Football transfer record
Transfer fee record
Record
British
British transfer fee record